The June List (jl) is a Swedish, Eurosceptic political party. Founded in 2004, it received 14% in the European Parliament election of the same year - gaining three seats. In the elections of 2009, however, it saw a drop of 11 percentage points in support and lost all of its seats. It currently holds no seats in parliament and does not play any active role in Swedish politics.

The party also ran in the Swedish 2006 parliamentary election, but it only received 0.47% of the votes, far below the 4% needed to get into parliament.

History

Foundation 

The party was formed in 2004, in the wake of the Swedish euro referendum held in September 2003, in which the adoption of the euro was rejected.

The party's co-founder is Nils Lundgren, a former member of the Swedish Social Democratic Party and chief economist of the bank Nordea, who is sceptical of the euro. Lundgren hoped to receive support from eurosceptical voters dissatisfied with their usual parties' positive attitudes towards the euro and further European integration. Among the Swedish parties represented in parliament at the time, only the Left Party, Center Party and the Green Party were eurosceptic, while the Social Democratic Party, the major left-wing party, and all right-wing parties with exception of the Center party were positive towards European integration. Aiming at receiving support from this broad political spectrum, the board of the party contained people that had been previously active in both left- and right-wing parties.

The party takes its name from the June Movement in Denmark, which is a eurosceptic party named after the timing of the Danish referendum that rejected the Treaty of Maastricht. The June Movement was also a major source of inspiration for the June List.

2004 European Parliament election 

The party succeeded in capturing 14% of the votes in the 2004 European Parliament election, thereby gaining three of the 19 Swedish seats. The three MEPs were Nils Lundgren, former social democrat Hélène Goudin and former Christian democrat Lars Wohlin.

In 2006 Wohlin, left the June List for the Christian Democrats, leaving the party with only two seats. Wohlin stated that he wanted to be able to "work for the Christian Democrats and the Alliance for Sweden in the 2006 parliamentary election" as reason for leaving the June List.

The June List was one of the founding members of the Independence and Democracy group in the European Parliament.

2006 elections 

The June List was on the ballot for the 2006 parliamentary elections in Sweden. The party's platform during the election focused on a few main issues: to increase the number of people working in the private sector, hence increasing the state's tax income, a referendum on the European Union constitution and nuclear power, and increased municipal autonomy and more local referendums. All issues that were not in the party's relatively short party program were left to the approximately 100 candidates to decide on. The voters were encouraged to choose to vote for a particular June List candidate that they preferred rather than to cast a general ballot for the party itself.

At one point it seemed possible that the party might be able to break the 4% threshold necessary to enter parliament, with the party reaching 4.5% in the polls in September 2005, but after that peak the party's support plummeted well below the 4% barrier and in the months before the election it became clear that the party would not be taking seats in parliament that year. In the end, the party received only 26,072 votes (0.47%).

Swedish businessman Sven Hagströmer, one of the two men who gave his name to the Hagströmer & Qviberg group of companies, served on the board of the party.

2009 European Parliament election 

The June List suffered a significant decline in its support at the 2009 election and lost all of its seats in the European parliament.

See also
Referendums in Sweden
List of political parties in Sweden

References

External links
Junilistan 

2004 establishments in Sweden
Eurosceptic parties in Sweden
Political parties established in 2004
Defunct political parties in Sweden